Ga-Tšhipana is a village in Ga-Matlala in the Mogalakwena Local Municipality of the Waterberg District Municipality of the Limpopo province of South Africa. It is located 69 km northwest of the city Polokwane.

References 

Populated places in the Mogalakwena Local Municipality